François Ducuing (23 May 1817 - 2 October 1875) was a French journalist and politician. He served as a member of the National Assembly from 1871 to 1875, representing Hautes-Pyrénées. He belonged to the Centre gauche parliamentary group.

References

1817 births
1875 deaths
People from Hautes-Pyrénées
Politicians from Occitania (administrative region)
French republicans
Members of the National Assembly (1871)
19th-century French journalists